Union County Jail is a historic jail building located at Union, Union County, South Carolina. It is attributed to Robert Mills and built in 1823.  It is a two-story, Palladian style granite ashlar structure. The structure has had two additions since 1900 and the interior has undergone extensive alteration.

It was added to the National Register of Historic Places in 1974.

References

Robert Mills buildings
Jails on the National Register of Historic Places in South Carolina
Palladian Revival architecture in the United States
Government buildings completed in 1823
Buildings and structures in Union County, South Carolina
National Register of Historic Places in Union County, South Carolina
Jails in South Carolina